Meanook is a hamlet in northern Alberta, Canada within Athabasca County.

Demographics 

See also 
List of communities in Alberta
List of designated places in Alberta
List of hamlets in Alberta
Meanook Magnetic Observatory

References 

Athabasca County
Hamlets in Alberta
Designated places in Alberta